The Mount Tapulao forest mouse (Apomys brownorum) is a forest mouse endemic to the Mount Tapulao area in the Philippines. It is named after the American zoologist Barbara Elaine Russell Brown.

Anatomy and physiology 
The mouse is the smallest species in its genus, measuring in total "230-255 mm; tail: 107-116 mm; hind foot: 31-35 mm; ear: 21 - 22 mm" and weighing 60-84 grams. On its dorsal side, the mouse has long, dense, soft, dark brown fur, with dark gray ventral fur turning a lighter gray-brown at the tips. Its tail is bicolored, "dark grayish-brown dorsally and nearly white ventrally."

Ecology 
The Mount Tapulaou forest mouse lives in old growth cloud forests and regenerating secondary forests at a height of 2024 m, with a lower limit somewhere between 1690 m and 2024 m. It is unknown how extensive chromium mining of the habitat affects the species.

Behavior 
The mouse eats seeds and invertebrates such as earthworms. It is nocturnal.

References

Apomys
Rodents of the Philippines
Mammals described in 2011
Endemic fauna of the Philippines